Chesbrough may refer to:

People 
Ellis S. Chesbrough (1813–1886), American engineer
Henry Chesbrough (born 1956), American organizational theorist

Places 
 Chesbrough, Louisiana
 Chesbrough Seminary